Gimnasia y Esgrima (Gymnastics and Fencing) is the name of several sports clubs in Argentina:

Gimnasia y Esgrima de Buenos Aires (GEBA)
Gimnasia y Esgrima de Comodoro Rivadavia
Gimnasia y Esgrima de Concepción del Uruguay
Gimnasia y Esgrima de Jujuy (GEJ)
Club de Gimnasia y Esgrima La Plata (CGE or GELP)
 Gimnasia y Esgrima (basketball)
Gimnasia y Esgrima de Mendoza
Gimnasia y Esgrima de Santa Fe